The Jubilee Medal "100 Years of the Trans-Siberian Railway" is a state commemorative medal of the Russian Federation created to denote the 100th anniversary of the Trans-Siberian Railway.  It was established on June 27, 2001 by Presidential Decree № 777.

Medal statute 
The Jubilee Medal "100 Years of the Trans-Siberian Railway" is awarded to employees of the railways who worked flawlessly in the industry for 20 years or more, as well as to other citizens of the Russian Federation who have made a significant contribution to the development of the Trans-Siberian railway.

Presidential Decree 1099 of September 7, 2010 removed the Medal "100 Years of the Trans-Siberian Railway" from the list of state awards of the Russian Federation. It is no longer awarded.

Medal description 
The Jubilee Medal "100 Years of the Trans-Siberian Railway" is a silver 32mm in diameter circular medal with raised rims on both sides.  On its obverse the relief image of a locomotive pulling a train towards the right at a shallow angle.  Above the train, the ancient emblem of Siberia (two sables supporting a crown, a bow and arrows).  Along the medal circumference in the upper half of the obverse, the relief inscription "100 Years of the Trans-Siberian Railway".  The reverse center bears the relief inscription "1901 2001" with the image of a crossed hammer and wrench.

The medal is suspended by a ring through the award's suspension loop to a standard Russian pentagonal mount covered with an overlapping 24mm wide silk moiré ribbon with three equal 8mm wide stripes of green, black and silver.

Notable recipients 
The individuals listed below were awarded the current Russian Federation Jubilee Medal "100 Years of the Trans-Siberian Railway":

Governor of the Sverdlovsk Oblast Alexander Sergeevich Misharin
Former Minister of the Internal Affairs of Russia Rashid Gumarovich Nurgaliyev
Writer, doctor of historical sciences Valerii Nikolaevich Ganichev
Politician, Chairman of the Government of the Sverdlovsk Oblast Anatoly Leonidovich Gredin

See also 

 Awards and decorations of the Russian Federation
 Trans-Siberian Railway
 Russian Railways

References

External links
 The Commission on State Awards to the President of the Russian Federation
 The Russian Gazette  In Russian

Awards established in 2001
Civil awards and decorations of Russia
Russian awards